The 2009 UCI Mountain Bike & Trials World Championships were held in Canberra, Australia from 1 to 6 September 2009. The disciplines included were cross-country, downhill, four-cross, and trials. The event was the 20th edition of the UCI Mountain Bike World Championships and the 24th edition of the UCI Trials World Championships.

The event was the second UCI Mountain Bike World Championships to be held in Australia, following the 1996 World Championships in Cairns.

Medal summary

Men's events

Women's events

Team events

Medal table

See also
2009 UCI Mountain Bike World Cup

References

External links

 Official website
 Results for the mountain-bike events on cyclingnews.com
 Results for the trials events on uci.ch

UCI Mountain Bike World Championships
2009 UCI Mountain Bike World Championships
UCI Mountain Bike World Championships
Mountain biking events in Australia